This is an incomplete listing of awards and nominations received by American country music singer Garth Brooks.

List of awards

Academy of Country Music Awards
Brooks has been nominated for a total of forty nine Academy of Country Music Awards, winning twenty three.

|-
|rowspan="4"| 1989 || Garth Brooks || Top New Male Vocalist || rowspan="10" 
|-
| rowspan="3"| "If Tomorrow Never Comes" || Song of the Year – Artist
|-
| Song of the Year – Composer
|-
| Single of the Year
|-
|rowspan="7"| 1990 || rowspan="2"| Garth Brooks || Entertainer of the Year 
|-
| Male Vocalist of the Year
|-
| rowspan="2"| "The Dance" || Song of the Year
|-
| Video of the Year
|-
| No Fences || Album of the Year
|-
|rowspan="2"| "Friends in Low Places" || Single of the Year
|-
| Song of the Year || 
|-
|rowspan="6"| 1991 || rowspan="2"| Garth Brooks || Entertainer of the Year || rowspan="2" 
|-
| Male Vocalist of the Year
|-
| Ropin' the Wind || rowspan="2"| Album of the Year || rowspan="4" 
|-
| No Fences
|-
| "Shameless" || Single of the Year
|-
| "The Thunder Rolls" || Video of the Year
|-
|rowspan="4"| 1992 || rowspan="2"| Garth Brooks || Entertainer of the Year || 
|-
| Top Male Vocalist || rowspan="3" 
|-
| "Whatcha Gonna Do with a Cowboy" (with Chris LeDoux) || Top Vocal Duet
|-
| The Chase || Album of the Year
|-
|rowspan="4"| 1993 || Garth Brooks || Entertainer of the Year || rowspan="2" 
|-
| "We Shall Be Free" || Video of the Year 
|-
| Garth Brooks || Top Male Vocalist || rowspan="2" 
|-
| "Ain't Goin' Down ('Til the Sun Comes Up)" || Single of the Year
|-
|rowspan="5"| 1994 || Garth Brooks || Jim Reeves Memorial Award  || rowspan="2" 
|-
|"The Red Strokes" || Video of the Year
|-
|rowspan="2"| Garth Brooks ||  Entertainer of the Year || rowspan="6" 
|-
| Top Male Vocalist
|-
| In Pieces || Album of the Year
|-
| 1995 || rowspan="2"| Garth Brooks || rowspan="2"| Entertainer of the Year
|-
|rowspan="2"| 1996 
|-
| "The Change" || Video of the Year
|-
|rowspan="3"| 1997 || rowspan="2"| Garth Brooks || Gene Weed Special Achievement Award || rowspan="2" 
|-
| Entertainer of the Year 
|-
| Sevens || Album of the Year || rowspan="1" 
|-
|- "In Another's Eyes" (with Trisha Yearwood) || Vocal Event of the Year 
|-
|rowspan="3"| 1998 || rowspan="1"| Garth Brooks || Entertainer of the Year || 
|-
|- Top Male Vocalist  || rowspan="3" 
|-
| Double Live || Album of the Year || rowspan="2" 
|-
| Burnin' the Roadhouse Down (with Steve Wariner) || Vocal Event of the Year 
|-
| 1999 || rowspan="2"| Garth Brooks || Artist of the Decade || 
|-
|rowspan="2"| 2001 || Entertainer of the Year || rowspan="2" 
|-
| "Beer Run" (with George Jones) || Vocal Event of the Year
|-
| 2005  || rowspan="5"| Garth Brooks || 40th Anniversary Milestone Award || rowspan="4" 
|-
| 2007 || Crystal Milestone Award
|-
| 2010 || Cliffie Stone Pioneer Award
|-
| 2014 || Milestone Award
|-
| 2016 ||  Entertainer of the Year ||

American Music Awards
Brooks has been nominated for a total of twenty one American Music Awards, winning seventeen.

|-
|rowspan="1"| 1991 || rowspan="2"| Garth Brooks || rowspan="2"| Favorite Country Male Artist || rowspan="1" 
|-
|rowspan="4"| 1992 || rowspan="3" 
|-
| No Fences || Favorite Country Album
|-
| "The Thunder Rolls" || Favorite Country Single
|-
| Ropin' the Wind || Favorite Country Album || 
|-
|rowspan="3"| 1993 || rowspan="1"| Garth Brooks || Favorite Country Male Artist || rowspan="1" 
|-
| The Chase || Favorite Country Album || rowspan="2" 
|-
| "The River" || Favorite Country Single
|-
|rowspan="2"| 1994 || rowspan="1"| Garth Brooks || Favorite Country Male Artist || rowspan="1" 
|-
| In Pieces || Favorite Country Album || rowspan="1" 
|-
|rowspan="1"| 1995 || rowspan="2"| Garth Brooks || rowspan="2"| Favorite Country Male Artist || rowspan="4" 
|-
|rowspan="2"| 1996
|-
| The Hits || Favorite Country Album 
|-
|rowspan="2"| 1997 || rowspan="1"| Garth Brooks || Favorite Country Male Artist 
|-
| Fresh Horses || Favorite Country Album || rowspan="1" 
|-
|rowspan="2"| 1998 || rowspan="1"| Garth Brooks || Favorite Country Male Artist || rowspan="5" 
|-
| Sevens || Favorite Country Album 
|-
|rowspan="2"| 1999 || rowspan="1"| Garth Brooks || Favorite Country Male Artist 
|-
| Double Live || Favorite Country Album 
|-
| 2002 || rowspan="2"| Garth Brooks || Award of Merit
|-
|rowspan="2"| 2008 || Favorite Country Male Artist || rowspan="3" 
|-
| The Ultimate Hits || rowspan="2"| Favorite Country Album 
|-
|rowspan="1"| 2014 || rowspan="1"| Blame It All on My Roots: Five Decades of Influences

ASCAP Awards
Brooks has won three ASCAP Awards.

|-
|rowspan="1"| 1993 || rowspan="3"| Garth Brooks || rowspan="1"| Songwriter of the Year || rowspan="3" 
|-
|rowspan="1"| 1999 || rowspan="1"| Founder Award
|-
|rowspan="1"| 2014 || rowspan="1"| Centennial Award

Billboard Music Awards
Brooks has been nominated for twenty three Billboard Music Awards, winning nineteen.

|-
|rowspan="2"| 1991 || rowspan="1"| Garth Brooks || rowspan="1"| Album Artist of the Year || rowspan="10" 
|-
| No Fences || Top Country Album
|-
|rowspan="5"| 1992 || rowspan="4"| Garth Brooks || Top Artist 
|-
| Top Country Artist
|-
| Top Pop Artist
|-
| Album Artist of the Year
|-
| Ropin' the Wind || Top Country Album
|-
|rowspan="3"| 1993 || rowspan="3"| Garth Brooks || Top Artist 
|-
| Top Country Artist
|-
| Top Pop Artist
|-
|rowspan="1"| 1995 || rowspan="1"| The Hits || Top Billboard 200 Album || rowspan="2" 
|-
|rowspan="1"| 1996 || rowspan="6"| Garth Brooks || Top Country Artist 
|-
|rowspan="1"| 1997 || Billboard Music Artist Achievement Award || rowspan="7" 
|-
|rowspan="6"| 1998 || Top Country Artist 
|-
| Country Song Artist of the Year
|-
| Country Album Artist of the Year
|-
| Male Album Artist of the Year
|-
|rowspan="2"| Sevens || Male Album of the Year
|-
| Top Country Album
|-
|rowspan="2"| 1999 || rowspan="3"| Garth Brooks || Album Artist of the Year || rowspan="4" 
|-
| Country Album Artist of the Year
|-
|rowspan="1"| 2002 || Country Songs Artist of the Year
|-
|rowspan="1"| 2014 || rowspan="1"| Blame It All on My Roots: Five Decades of Influences || Top Country Album

Blockbuster Entertainment Awards
Brooks has won two Blockbuster Entertainment Awards.

|-
|rowspan="1"| 1997 || rowspan="2"| "Garth Brooks || rowspan="1"| Artist of the 90s || rowspan="2" 
|-
|rowspan="1"| 2000 || rowspan="1"| Favorite Male Country Artist

Canadian Country Music Association

|-
|rowspan="1"| 1996 || rowspan="1"| Fresh Horses || rowspan="1"| Top Selling Album || rowspan="1"

CMT Music Awards
Brooks has been nominated for three CMT Music Awards, winning two.

|-
|rowspan="2"| 1991 || rowspan="1"| Garth Brooks || rowspan="1"| Entertainer of the Year || rowspan="2" 
|-
|rowspan="1"| "The Dance" || Video of the Year
|-
|rowspan="1"| 2008 || rowspan="1"| "Workin' for a Livin' (with Huey Lewis) || rowspan="1"| Collaborative Video of the Year || rowspan="1"

Country Music Association Awards

|-
|rowspan="5"| 1990 || Garth Brooks || Horizon Award || rowspan="2" 
|-
| "The Dance" || Music Video of the Year
|-
| Garth Brooks || Male Vocalist of the Year || rowspan="3" 
|-
|rowspan="2"| "If Tomorrow Never Comes" || Song of the Year
|-
| Single of the Year
|-
|rowspan="5"| 1991 || Garth Brooks || Entertainer of the Year || rowspan="4" 
|-
| No Fences || Album of the Year
|-
| "Friends in Low Places" || Single of the Year
|-
| "The Thunder Rolls" || Music Video of the Year
|-
|rowspan="2"| Garth Brooks || Male Vocalist of the Year || rowspan="1" 
|-
|rowspan="3"| 1992 || Entertainer of the Year || rowspan="2" 
|-
| Ropin' the Wind || Album of the Year
|-
|rowspan="3"| Garth Brooks || Male Vocalist of the Year || rowspan="10" 
|-
|rowspan="4"| 1993 || Entertainer of the Year
|-
|Male Vocalist of the Year
|-
| The Chase || Album of the Year
|-
| "I Don't Need Your Rockin' Chair" (with George Jones, Vince Gill, and Mark Chesnutt) || Vocal Event of the Year || rowspan="2" 
|-
|rowspan="2"| 1994 || Garth Brooks || Entertainer of the Year ||
|-
| "Standing Outside the Fire" || Music Video of the Year
|-
|rowspan="2"| 1995 || Garth Brooks || Entertainer of the Year 
|-
| "The Red Strokes" || Music Video of the Year
|-
|rowspan="1"| 1996 || rowspan="4"| Garth Brooks || rowspan="3"| Entertainer of the Year 
|-
|rowspan="1"| 1997 || rowspan="2" 
|-
|rowspan="4"| 1998
|-
|Male Vocalist of the Year || rowspan="6" 
|-
| Sevens || Album of the Year
|-
| "In Another's Eyes" (with Trisha Yearwood) || Vocal Event of the Year
|-
|rowspan="1"| 1999 || rowspan="1"| Garth Brooks || Entertainer of the Year
|-
|rowspan="1"| 2002 || "Beer Run" (with George Jones) || Vocal Event of the Year
|-
|rowspan="1"| 2015 || rowspan="4"|Garth Brooks || rowspan="4"|Entertainer of the Year
|-
|rowspan="1"| 2016 ||   
|-
|rowspan="1"| 2017 ||   
|-
|rowspan="1"| 2019 ||   
|-

GLAAD Media Awards
Brooks has won one GLAAD Media Award.

|-
|rowspan="1"| 1993 || rowspan="1"| "We Shall Be Free" || rowspan="1"| Outstanding Recording || rowspan="1"

Golden Globe Awards
Brooks has been nominated for one Golden Globe Award.

|-
|rowspan="1"| 2001 || rowspan="1"| "When You Come Back to Me Again" (Frequency) || rowspan="1"| Best Original Song || rowspan="1"

Grammy Awards
Brooks has been nominated for a total of thirteen Grammy Awards, winning two.

|-
|rowspan="1"| 1990 || rowspan="1"| "Friends in Low Places" || rowspan="2"| Best Male Country Vocal Performance || rowspan="1" 
|-
|rowspan="2"| 1991  || rowspan="1"| Ropin' the Wind || rowspan="1" 
|-
| "The Thunder Rolls" || Best Music Video || rowspan="4" 
|-
|rowspan="2"| 1992  || rowspan="1"| The Chase || rowspan="1"| Best Male Country Vocal Performance 
|-
| "Whatcha Gonna Do with a Cowboy" (with Chris LeDoux) || Best Country Collaboration with Vocals 
|-
|rowspan="1"| 1993  || rowspan="1"| "Ain't Goin' Down ('Til the Sun Comes Up)" || rowspan="1"| Best Male Country Vocal Performance 
|-
|rowspan="2"| 1997  || rowspan="2"| "In Another's Eyes" (with Trisha Yearwood) || Best Country Collaboration with Vocals || rowspan="1" 
|-
| Best Country Song || rowspan="6" 
|-
|rowspan="3"| 1998 || rowspan="1"| "To Make You Feel My Love" || Best Male Country Vocal Performance
|-
| "Where Your Road Leads" (with Trisha Yearwood) || Best Country Collaboration with Vocals 
|-
| Sevens || Best Country Album
|-
|rowspan="1"| 2001 || rowspan="1"| "Beer Run" (with George Jones) || rowspan="2"| Best Country Collaboration with Vocals
|-
|rowspan="1"| 2002 || rowspan="1"| "Squeeze Me In" (with Trisha Yearwood)
|-
|rowspan="1"| 2007 || rowspan="1"| "Love Will Always Win" (with Trisha Yearwood) || rowspan="2"| Best Country Collaboration with Vocals || rowspan="1"

Grammys on the Hill Awards

|-
|rowspan="1"| 2010 || rowspan="1"| Garth Brooks || rowspan="1"| Solo Artist of the Century || rowspan="1"

iHeartRadio Music Awards

|-
|rowspan="1"| 2016 || rowspan="1"| The Garth Brooks World Tour with Trisha Yearwood || rowspan="1"| Best Tour || rowspan="1"

Juno Awards
Brooks has been nominated for two Juno Awards, winning one.

|-
|rowspan="1"| 1992 || rowspan="2"| Garth Brooks || Foreign Entertainer of the Year || 
|-
|rowspan="1"| 1993 || International Entertainer of the Year ||

NAACP Image Awards
Brooks has won one NAACP Image Award.

|-
|rowspan="1"| 1996 || rowspan="1"| Garth Brooks || Founders Award ||

People's Choice Awards

|-
|rowspan="2"| 1992 || rowspan="10"| Garth Brooks || rowspan="1"| Favorite Male Artist || rowspan="6" 
|-
| Favorite Country Male Singer
|-
|rowspan="1"| 1993 || rowspan="4"| Favorite Male Artist
|-
|rowspan="1"| 1994
|-
|rowspan="1"| 1995
|-
|rowspan="1"| 1996
|-
|rowspan="2"| 1997 || rowspan="1"| Favorite All-Time Music Performer || rowspan="1" 
|-
|rowspan="3"| Favorite Male Artist || rowspan="3" 
|-
|rowspan="1"| 2001 
|-
|rowspan="1"| 2002

Primetime Emmy Awards

|-
|rowspan="2"| 1998 || rowspan="1"| Garth Brooks || rowspan="1"| Outstanding Performance in a Variety or Music Program || rowspan="2" 
|-
| Garth Live From Central Park || Outstanding Variety, Music, or Comedy Special

Radio Music Awards

|-
|rowspan="1"| 2000 || rowspan="1"| Garth Brooks || rowspan="1"| Artist of the Year: Country Radio || rowspan="1"

Songwriters Hall of Fame Awards

|-
|2002 || Garth Brooks || Howie Richmond Hitmaker Award ||

SoundExchange Awards
Brooks has won one SoundExchange Award, the SoundExchange Digital Radio Award, after receiving over 1 billion streams of his music on digital services within a year, becoming the first country artist to win the award.

|-
|2015 || Garth Brooks || SoundExchange Digital Radio Award ||

World Music Awards

|-
|rowspan="1"| 1992 || rowspan="5"| Garth Brooks || rowspan="5"| World's Best Selling Country Artist || rowspan="5" 
|-
|rowspan="1"| 1993
|-
|rowspan="1"| 1994
|-
|rowspan="1"| 1995
|-
|rowspan="1"| 1996
|-
|rowspan="1"| 2014 || rowspan="1"| Blame It All on My Roots: Five Decades of Influences || World's Best Album || rowspan="5"

References

Brooks, Garth